Harry Clayton Fanwell (October 16, 1886 – July 15, 1965) was a Major League Baseball pitcher who played for one season. He pitched 17 games for the Cleveland Naps during the 1910 Cleveland Naps season.

External links

1886 births
1965 deaths
Major League Baseball pitchers
Cleveland Naps players
Baseball players from Maryland
Utica Pent-Ups players
Danville Red Sox players
Portland Beavers players
New Haven Murlins players